Worthy Park House is a large country house at Kings Worthy near Winchester. It is a Grade II* listed building.

History
The original house on the site was built by William Evelyn in 1722. It was bought by Sir Chaloner Ogle, 1st Baronet in 1773. Admiral Sir Charles Ogle, 2nd Baronet inherited the house in 1816 and commissioned Sir Robert Smirke to demolish the west wing and replace it with a new building, built in the Georgian style, which was completed in 1820.

The house was acquired by Samuel Wall, a banker in 1825  (died 1843) but remained in the Wall family until it passed by marriage to Captain Charles Gilbert Fryer in the mid 1870s. It then remained in the Fryer family passing to Colonel James A Butchart, again by marriage c1920. During the Second World War it was taken over by the British Army. After the war it served as a training centre owned first by Currys and then by National Express. The house became Prince's Mead School in 1999.

References

Country houses in Hampshire
Grade II* listed buildings in Hampshire